Port-Menier Airport  is located  east of Port-Menier, Quebec, Canada.

The airport has a single small terminal building, and is serviced by a single runway.

Airlines and destinations

References

Certified airports in Côte-Nord
Anticosti Island